Alinjarria is a genus of bush-crickets including two species, one from the east of Australia and the other from the west. The genus was erected by Rentz, Su & Ueshima in 2007.

Species
Alinjarria elongata (Rentz)
Alinjarria jadni Rentz, Su & Ueshima

References

Tettigoniidae genera